Ahmad Aali ((born 1935) is an Iranian photographer and artist.

Biography 
Ahmad Aali was born in 1935 in Tabriz, Iran. In the 1960s, he attended the Kamal-ol-Molk art school in Iran. He is married to artist Mina Nouri.

Ahmad Aali came to Tehran in 1949 and first studied painting and drawing at the Conservatory of Visual Arts, and later in the free classes of Kamal Al-Molk Conservatory. After his initial acquaintance with the camera, he gradually became fascinated with it and gradually began to learn technical issues in photography. In the mid-1950s, he became acquainted with world-renowned photographers through foreign photo magazines and was influenced by new ideas. Aali held his first solo exhibition, including photographs with new perspectives and compositions, at the Culture Hall in 1963, and has since held several solo and group exhibitions. Having a close relationship with Iranian modernist painters and sculptors, he took a formalistic and modernist look at his work, emphasizing that photography was not a mere copy of reality. One of the great innovations in Iranian photography is the creation of mosaic combinations of photographs that did not correspond to the classical methods of photography. He exhibited this collection of his works for the first time in 1968 in Seyhoun Gallery. Another part of his works includes documentary photographs, which at the same time have found a general and human face due to repetition and sequence. After the revolution, he spent more time on his painting experiences, which are generally hyper-realistic in nature, and a number of his works were done in the form of paintings on photographs. In 1997, a large number of his photographs were exhibited in the review exhibition of Ahmad Aali's works, and in 2010, 2012, and 2016, he held solo exhibitions of his new and old works.

His work is in numerous public museum collections, such as the British Museum, the Los Angeles County Museum of Art (LACMA), among others.

Solo exhibitions
This is a select list of solo exhibitions by Aali, in order by date:
 2010 – Ahmad Aali Selection of Works, 1961–2009, Mah-e Mehr Gallery, Tehran, Iran. This exhibition included 48 years of his photo work in a retrospective.
 2012 – Aaran Gallery (Recycle), Tehran, Iran
 2016 – Emkan Art Gallery (Ahmad Aali's Self-Portrait with G 11),Tehran, Iran
 2018 – Azad Art Gallery (Recycled 2), Tehran, Iran

Bibliography

As author

As subject 
A brief review on the creative photography of Iran 40's and 50's Faeghe Shokouh Nikoui (Anita) 2003, Azad University of art and architecture
 History of development of alternative Techniques of photography, Photomontage and photocollage Mehrnegar Fariborz 2001, Azad University of art and architecture
 Life and works of Ahmad Aali by Farhad Ranjbaran, 1998, Azad University of art and architecture

See also
 Culture of Iran
 Islamic art
 Iranian art
 List of Iranian artists

References

External links
 Ahmad Aali, book launch at Mah-e Mehr Art Center (in persian)
 Photo exhibition by Ahmad Aali – Tavoos Art Ezine

1935 births
Living people
People from Tabriz
Iranian painters
Iranian photographers
Iranian artists